The 1944 Saint Mary's Pre-Flight Air Devils football team represented the United States Navy pre-flight school at Saint Mary's College of California during the 1944 college football season. In its third season, the team compiled a 4–4 record, outscored opponents by a total of 96 to 70, and was ranked No. 19 in the final AP Poll.  This would be 1 of only 3 college football programs to make the final AP poll with a .500 or lower win percentage, with the other two being Notre Dame in 1959 (5-5, #17), and Purdue in 1960 (4-4-1, #19)

In August 1944, Lt. Jules V. Sikes was named as the team's coach. He had been an assistant coach to the 1943 team.

Schedule

References

St. Mary's Pre-Flight
Saint Mary's Pre-Flight Air Devils football seasons
Saint Mary's Pre-Flight Air Devils football